Benito Nicolas Viola (born 12 October 1989) is an Italian footballer who plays as a midfielder for  club Cagliari. He is the older brother of fellow footballer Alessio Viola.

Career

Reggina
Viola was born in Oppido Mamertina, in the same province of Reggina Calcio. Viola made his Serie A debut for Reggina on 11 January 2009 against S.S. Lazio. He also played twice at 2008–09 Coppa Italia.

Palermo
On 30 January 2012, Palermo announced to have purchased Viola from Reggina in a co-ownership agreement with the club, for €1.8 million in a -year contract. The player would stay on loan at Reggina until the end of the 2011–12 Serie B season.

Ternana
On 1 July 2013, Ternana acquired Viola from Reggina, with Palermo retained the 50% registration rights. In June 2015 the co-ownership deal expired, as Ternana did not purchase him from Palermo. However, Palermo also released Viola for free.

Novara
On 2 August 2015, Viola was signed by Novara Calcio.

Benevento
On 31 January 2017, Viola was signed by Benevento in a -year contract.

Bologna
On 20 October 2021, he signed with Bologna.

Cagliari
On 2 July 2022, Viola joined Cagliari on a two-year contract.

References

External links
Profile at La Gazzetta 2008-09
Profile at ESPN
Profile at Reggina

1989 births
Living people
Italian footballers
Italy youth international footballers
Reggina 1914 players
Palermo F.C. players
Ternana Calcio players
Novara F.C. players
Benevento Calcio players
Bologna F.C. 1909 players
Cagliari Calcio players
Serie A players
Serie B players
Association football midfielders
Sportspeople from the Metropolitan City of Reggio Calabria
Footballers from Calabria